The Women's 3000 metres competition at the 2021 World Single Distances Speed Skating Championships was held on 11 February 2021.

Results
The race was started at 14:40.

References

Women's 3000 metres
2021 in women's speed skating